Medicine Hat-Redcliff was a provincial electoral district in Alberta, Canada, mandated to return a single member to the Legislative Assembly of Alberta using the first past the post method of voting from 1971 to 1979.

History

The Medicine Hat-Redcliff electoral district was named for the City of Medicine Hat and the Town of Redcliff.

The electoral district was created in the 1971 re-distribution absorbing the district of Medicine Hat, and was abolished in the 1979 re-distribution splitting into Cypress-Medicine Hat and Medicine Hat electoral districts.

Representatives
The district was represented in the Legislative Assembly of Alberta by William Wyse in the 17th Alberta Legislative Assembly from 1971 to 1975, and Jim Horsman in the 18th Alberta Legislative Assembly from 1975 to 1979.

Electoral history

1971 general election

1975 general election

See also
List of Alberta provincial electoral districts
Medicine Hat, Alberta, a city in Alberta
Redcliff, Alberta, a town in Alberta

References

Further reading

External links
Elections Alberta
The Legislative Assembly of Alberta

Former provincial electoral districts of Alberta
Politics of Medicine Hat